The anchor text, link label or link text is the visible, clickable text in an HTML hyperlink. The HTML specification does not have a specific term for anchor text, but refers to it as "text that the a element wraps around". In XML terms (since HTML is XML), the anchor text is the content of the element, provided that the content is text.

Usually, web search engines analyze anchor text from hyperlinks on web pages. The words contained in the anchor text can determine the ranking that the page will receive by search engines. Other services apply the basic principles of anchor text analysis as well. For instance, academic search engines may use citation context to classify academic articles, and anchor text from documents linked in mind maps may be used too.

Overview
Anchor text usually gives the user relevant descriptive or contextual information about the content of the link's destination. The anchor text may or may not be related to the actual text of the URL of the link. For example, a hyperlink to the English-language Wikipedia's homepage might take this form:
	
<a href="http://en.wikipedia.org/wiki/Main_Page">Wikipedia</a>

"Wikipedia" is the anchor text in this example. The URL it points to is http://en.wikipedia.org/wiki/Main_Page.

Search engine algorithms
Anchor text is weighted (ranked) highly in search engine algorithms, because the linked text is usually relevant to the landing page. The objective of search engines is to provide highly relevant search results; this is where anchor text helps, as the tendency was, more often than not, to hyperlink words relevant to the landing page. Anchor text can also serve the purpose of directing the user to internal pages on the site, which can also help to rank the website higher in the search rankings.

Webmasters may use anchor text to procure high results in search engine results pages. Google's Webmaster Tools facilitate this optimization by letting website owners view the most common words in anchor text linking to their site.
In the past, Google bombing was possible through anchor text manipulation; however, in January 2007, Google announced it had updated its algorithm to minimize the impact of Google bombs, which refers to a prank where people attempt to cause someone else's site to rank for an obscure or meaningless query.

In April 2012, Google announced in its March "Penguin" update that it would be changing the way it handled anchor text, implying that anchor text would no longer be as important an element for their ranking metrics. Moving forward, Google would be paying more attention to a diversified link profile which has a mix of anchor text and other types of links.
.

However a 2016 study of anchor text influence across 16,000 keywords found that presence of exact and partial match anchor links continues to have a strong correlation with Google rankings.

August 2016 study conducted by Moz, found that Exact and partial match domains can be affected by over optimization penalty since Google considers domain Brand and naked URL links as Exact match.

Terminology
There are different classifications of anchor text that are used within the search engine optimization community such as the following:

Exact match an anchor that is used with a keyword that mirrors the page that is being linked to. Example: "search engine optimization" is an exact match anchor because it's linking to a page about "search engine optimization".
Partial match an anchor that is used with a keyword and a variation that mirrors the page that is being linked to. Example: "different search engine optimization techniques" is a partial match anchor when it's linking to a page about "search engine optimization".
Branded a brand that is used as the anchor. "Wikipedia" is a branded anchor text.
Naked link a URL that is used as an anchor. "www.wikipedia.com" is a naked link anchor.
Generic a generic word or phrase that is used as the anchor. "Click here" is a generic anchor. Other variations may include "go here", "visit this website", etc.
Images whenever an image is linked, Google will use the "alt" attribute as the anchor text.
Empty whenever an image is linked, and the "alt" attribute is empty.
Latent semantic indexing Latent semantic indexing (LSI) is a method used by Google to determine similar keywords.

References

Information retrieval techniques
Internet search engines
Internet terminology
Search engine optimization
Hypertext